The Western Academic Talent Search (WATS) is a talent search program based at the CU Boulder in Boulder, Colorado for students in the states of Colorado, Utah, Nevada, Idaho, New Mexico, Montana, and Wyoming with high academic achievement. Students are selected from the top 95th percentile from each subject and are administered a number of college-entrance exams to determine their talent compared to others. If the exam scores are high enough, they are eligible for various programs including one-, two- and three-week college-level courses at CU Boulder.  Usually, around 300 students attended the WATS/Center for Bright Kids summer camps each year.

Western Academic Talent Search (WATS) was formerly known as the Rocky Mountain Talent Search.  WATS is part of the Center for Bright Kids.

External links
Western Academic Talent Search main website
Center for Bright Kids main website

Gifted education